The 2022 Chevrolet Grand Prix was a sports car race held at the Canadian Tire Motorsports Park in Bowmanville, Ontario, Canada on July 3, 2022. It was the eighth round of the 2022 IMSA SportsCar Championship and the fifth round of the 2022 WeatherTech Sprint Cup. The 01 Cadillac Racing entry piloted by Sébastien Bourdais and Renger van der Zande took the overall victory. The No. 54 CORE Autosport Ligier JS P320 driven by Jon Bennett and Colin Braun won in the LMP3 class. In the GTD Pro class, the No. 9 Pfaff Motorsports Porsche 911 GT3 R driven by Mathieu Jaminet and Matt Campbell claimed victory, while in GTD the No. 27 Heart of Racing Team Aston Martin Vantage AMR GT3 driven by Roman De Angelis and Maxime Martin claimed victory.

Background

Entries

A total of 24 cars took part in the event, split across four classes. 6 were entered in DPi, 6 in LMP3, 6 in GT Daytona Pro, and 6 in GTD.

Qualifying

Qualifying results

Results

Race 

References

External links

2022 Chevrolet Grand Prix
Chevrolet Grand Prix
Chevrolet Grand Prix
Chevrolet Grand Prix
Grand Prix of Mosport
2022 WeatherTech SportsCar Championship season